Chaliapin may refer to:

Feodor Chaliapin (1873-1938), Russian opera singer
Boris Chaliapin, artist and illustrator, son of Feodor Chaliapin
Feodor Chaliapin, Jr. (1905-1992), actor, son of Feodor Chaliapin
Prokhor Chaliapin, Russian folk singer and television personality
2562 Chaliapin, an asteroid
Chaliapin festival, Gagino, a Russian music event